Delphi Methodist Episcopal Church is a historic Methodist Episcopal church complex located at Delphi, Carroll County, Indiana.  The brick and limestone trimmed Gothic Revival style church sanctuary/auditorium was constructed in 1869 with alterations in 1884, 1897, and 1926.  It features a massive three-story bell tower on its northeast corner. The education wing was constructed in 1926 in the Collegiate Gothic style.  Also on the property is the two-story, Second Empire style brick parsonage constructed in 1897.

It was listed on the National Register of Historic Places in 2015.

References

Methodist churches in Indiana
Churches on the National Register of Historic Places in Indiana
Gothic Revival architecture in Indiana
Collegiate Gothic architecture in Indiana
Second Empire architecture in Indiana
Churches completed in 1869
Buildings and structures in Carroll County, Indiana
National Register of Historic Places in Carroll County, Indiana
Delphi, Indiana